The 2012–13 North of Scotland Cup began on 28 July 2012 and ended on 20 October 2012.

This season saw AJG Parcels as the sponsors for the first year with draw taking place at the Tulloch Caledonian Stadium, Inverness 15 June 2012.  The draw, like previous years, was split into north and south sections and due to the uneven number of teams competing several clubs receives byes into the second round.

2012–13 competing clubs
Brora Rangers
Clachnacuddin
Elgin City
Forres Mechanics
Fort William
Halkirk United
Inverness Caledonian Thistle
Lossiemouth
Nairn County
Ross County
Rothes
Strathspey Thistle
Thurso
Wick Academy

First round

East Section

North Section

Second round

East Section

North Section

Semi finals

East Section

North Section

Final

References 

North of Scotland Cup seasons
North of Scotland Cup